The 1808 United States presidential election was the sixth quadrennial presidential election, held from Friday, November 4, to Wednesday, December 7, 1808. The Democratic-Republican candidate James Madison defeated Federalist candidate Charles Cotesworth Pinckney decisively.

Madison had served as Secretary of State since President Thomas Jefferson took office in 1801. Jefferson, who had declined to run for a third term, threw his strong support behind Madison, a fellow Virginian. Sitting Vice President George Clinton and former Ambassador James Monroe both challenged Madison for leadership of the party, but Madison won his party's nomination and Clinton was re-nominated as vice president. The Federalists chose to re-nominate Pinckney, a former ambassador who had served as the party's 1804 nominee, again alongside Rufus King.

Despite the unpopularity of the Embargo Act of 1807, Madison won the vast majority of electoral votes outside of the Federalist stronghold of New England. Clinton received six electoral votes for president from his home state of New York. This election was the first of two instances in American history in which a new president was selected but the incumbent vice president won re-election, the other being in 1828.

Nominations

Democratic-Republican Party nomination

Presidential candidates 
 James Madison (Virginia), Secretary of State
 James Monroe (Virginia), Former U.S. Ambassador to the United Kingdom
 George Clinton (New York), Vice President of the United States

Vice-presidential candidates
 George Clinton (New York), Vice President of the United States
 John Langdon (New Hampshire), Governor
 Henry Dearborn (Massachusetts), Secretary of War
 John Quincy Adams (Massachusetts), United States Senator

Caucus

Senator Stephen R. Bradley, who had chaired the congressional nominating caucus during the 1804 presidential election, made a call for the 1808 caucus to the 146 Democratic-Republican members of the United States Congress and Federalist allies. The caucus was attended by 89 to 94 members of Congress.

The caucus was held in January 1808, and Secretary of State James Madison won the presidential nomination with the support of President Thomas Jefferson against James Monroe and Vice President George Clinton. The caucus voted to give the vice-presidential nomination to Clinton against his main opponent John Langdon although Clinton's supporters believed that he would receive the Federalist's presidential nomination, but it instead went to Charles Cotesworth Pinckney. A committee of fifteen members was selected to manage Madison's campaign.

Seventeen Democratic-Republicans in Congress opposed Madison's selection and the caucus system whose authority to select presidential and vice-presidential candidates was disputed. Clinton also opposed the caucus system. Monroe was nominated by a group of Virginia Democratic-Republicans, and although he did not actively try to defeat Madison, he also refused to withdraw from the race. Clinton was also supported by a group of New York Democratic-Republicans for president even as he remained the party's official vice presidential candidate.

Balloting

Federalist Party nomination

The Federalist caucus met in September 1808 and re-nominated the party's 1804 ticket, which consisted of General Charles Cotesworth Pinckney of South Carolina and former Senator Rufus King of New York.

General election

Campaign
The election was marked by opposition to Jefferson's Embargo Act of 1807, a halt to trade with Europe that disproportionately hurt New England merchants and was perceived as favoring France over Britain. Nonetheless, Jefferson was still very popular with Americans generally and Pinckney was soundly defeated by Madison, though not as badly as in 1804. Pinckney received few electoral votes outside of New England.

Results

Pinckney retained the electoral votes of the two states that he carried in 1804 (Connecticut and Delaware), and he also picked up New Hampshire, Massachusetts, Rhode Island, and three electoral districts in North Carolina besides the two electoral districts in Maryland that he carried earlier. Except for the North Carolina districts, all of the improvement was in New England.

Monroe won a portion of the popular vote in Virginia and North Carolina, while the New York legislature split its electoral votes between Madison and Clinton.

Popular vote by state 
The popular vote totals used are the elector from each party with the highest total of votes. The vote totals of North Carolina and Tennessee appear to be incomplete.

Close states 
States where the margin of victory was under 5%:
 New Hampshire, 4.8% (1,292 votes)

States where the margin of victory was under 10%:
 Rhode Island, 6.6% (380 votes)
 North Carolina, 7.55% (1,306 votes)

Electoral college selection

See also
 History of the United States (1789–1849)
 First inauguration of James Madison
 1808–1809 United States House of Representatives elections
 1808–1809 United States Senate elections

References

Further reading
 Brant, Irving, "Election of 1808" in Arthur Meier Schlesinger and Fred L. Israel, eds. History of American presidential elections, 1789-1968: Volume 1 (1971) pp 185-249
 Carson, David A. "Quiddism and the Reluctant Candidacy of James Monroe in the Election of 1808," Mid-America 1988 70(2): 79–89

External links 

 Election of 1808 in Counting the Votes 
 Presidential Election of 1808: A Resource Guide from the Library of Congress
 
 A New Nation Votes: American Election Returns, 1787-1825

 
Presidency of James Madison
James Madison